Omphalotropis mutica is a species of minute salt marsh snail with an operculum, a terrestrial gastropod mollusk, or micromollusk, in the family Assimineidae. This species is endemic to Palau.

References

Fauna of Palau
Omphalotropis
Assimineidae
Endemic fauna of Palau
Taxonomy articles created by Polbot